Okuku may refer to:

Okuku, Cross River State, a town in Nigeria
Okuku, Osun State, a town in Nigeria
Okuku, New Zealand, a town in the Waimakariri District, New Zealand